WeChat and Weixin are a Chinese instant messaging, social media, and mobile payment app developed by Tencent. First released in 2011, it became the world's largest standalone mobile app in 2018 with over 1 billion monthly active users. WeChat has been described as China's "app for everything" and a super-app because of its wide range of functions. WeChat provides text messaging, hold-to-talk voice messaging, broadcast (one-to-many) messaging, video conferencing, video games, sharing of photographs and videos and location sharing.

Accounts registered using Chinese phone numbers are managed under the Weixin brand, and their data is stored in mainland China and subject to Weixin's terms of service and privacy policy, which forbids content which "endanger[s] national security, divulge[s] state secrets, subvert[s] state power and undermine[s] national unity". Non-Chinese numbers are registered under WeChat, and WeChat users are subject to a different, less strict terms of service and stricter privacy policy, and their data is stored in the Netherlands for users in the European Union, and in Singapore for other users. User activity on Weixin, the Chinese version of the app, is analyzed, tracked and shared with Chinese authorities upon request as part of the mass surveillance network in China. Chinese-registered Weixin accounts censor politically sensitive topics. Data transmitted by WeChat accounts registered outside China is surveilled, analyzed and used to build up censorship algorithms in China.

In response to a border dispute between India and China, WeChat was banned in India in June 2020 along with several other Chinese apps, including TikTok. U.S. President Donald Trump sought to ban U.S. "transactions" with WeChat through an executive order but was blocked by a preliminary injunction issued in the United States District Court for the Northern District of California in September 2020. Joe Biden, Trump's successor as President, officially dropped Trump's efforts to ban WeChat in the U.S. in June 2021.

History
By 2010, Tencent had already attained a massive user base with their desktop messenger app QQ. Recognizing smart phones were likely to disrupt this status quo, CEO Pony Ma sought to proactively invest in alternatives to their own QQ messenger app.

WeChat began as a project at Tencent Guangzhou Research and Project center in October 2010. The original version of the app was created by Allen Zhang and named "Weixin" by Pony Ma and launched in 2011. User adoption of WeChat was initially very slow, with users wondering why key features were missing; however, after the release of the Walkie-talkie-like voice messaging feature in May of that year, growth surged. By 2012, when the number of users reached 100 million, Weixin was re-branded "WeChat" for the international market.

During a period of government support of e-commerce development—for example in the 12th five-year plan (2011–2015)—WeChat also saw new features enabling payments and commerce in 2013, which saw massive adoption after their virtual Red envelope promotion for Chinese New Year 2014.

WeChat had over 889 million monthly active users by 2016, and as of 2019 WeChat's monthly active users had risen to an estimate of one billion. As of January 2022, it was reported that WeChat has more than 1.2 billion users. After the launch of WeChat payment in 2013, its users reached 400 million the next year, 90 percent of whom were in China. By comparison, Facebook Messenger and WhatsApp had about one billion monthly active users in 2016 but did not offer most of the other services available on WeChat. For example, in Q2 2017, WeChat's revenues from social media advertising were about US$0.9 billion (RMB6 billion) compared with Facebook's total revenues of US$9.3 billion, 98% of which were from social media advertising. WeChat's revenues from its value-added services were US$5.5 billion.

In response to a border dispute between India and China, WeChat was banned in India in June 2020 along with several other Chinese apps. U.S. President Donald Trump sought to ban U.S. "transactions" with WeChat through an executive order but was blocked by a preliminary injunction issued in the United States District Court for the Northern District of California in September 2020.

Features

Messaging
WeChat provides many features similar to Snapchat such as text messaging, hold-to-talk voice messaging, broadcast (one-to-many) messaging, video calls and conferencing, video games, photograph and video sharing, as well as location sharing. WeChat also allows users to exchange contacts with people nearby via Bluetooth, as well as providing various features for contacting people at random if desired (if people are open to it). It can also integrate with other social networking services such as Facebook and Tencent QQ. Photographs may also be embellished with filters and captions, and automatic translation service is available.

WeChat supports different instant messaging methods, including text messages, voice messages, walkie talkie, and stickers. Users can send previously saved or live pictures and videos, profiles of other users, coupons, lucky money packages, or current GPS locations with friends either individually or in a group chat. WeChat's character stickers, such as Tuzki, resemble and compete with those of LINE, a Japanese-South Korean messaging application.

WeChat also provides a message recall feature to allow users to recall and withdraw information (e.g. Images, documents) that are sent within 2 minutes in a conversation. To use this feature, users can select the message or file to be recalled by long pressing. In the menu that appears select 'recall' and 'ok' to complete the withdrawal process. Eventually, the selected messages or files will be removed from the WeChat chatting box on both the sender's and recipient's phones.

Public accounts
WeChat users can register as a public account, which enables them to push feeds to subscribers, interact with subscribers and provide them with services. Users can also create an official account, which fall under service, subscription, or enterprise accounts. Once users as individuals or organizations set up a type of account, they cannot change it to another type. By the end of 2014, the number of WeChat official accounts had reached 8 million. Official accounts of organizations can apply to be verified (cost 300 RMB or about US$45). Official accounts can be used as a platform for services such as hospital pre-registrations, visa renewal or credit card service. To create an official account, the applicant must register with Chinese authorities, which discourages "foreign companies". In April 2022, WeChat announced that it will start displaying the location of users in China everytime they post on a public account. Meanwhile, overseas users on public accounts will also display the country based on their IP address.  In the official version of iOS WeChat 8.0.27 , which was released in 23/08/2022. The new feature shows that when browsing the official account article in the new version of WeChat or opening a webpage in WeChat, there will be an option “Save the whole page as a picture” in the lower right corner after the screenshot. Once users clicked, the system automatically takes a screenshot of the entire page, which provides a convenient option for users who like to bookmark their account posts.

Moments

"Moments" is WeChat's brand name for its social feed of friends' updates. "Moments" is an interactive platform that allows users to post images, text, and short videos taken by users. It also allows users to share articles and music (associated with QQ Music or other web-based music services). Friends in the contact list can give thumbs up to the content and leave comments. Moments can be linked to Facebook and Twitter accounts, and can automatically post Moments content directly on these two platforms.
 
In 2017 WeChat had a policy of a maximum of two advertisements per day per Moments user.

Privacy in WeChat works by groups of friends: only the friends from the user's contact are able to view their Moments' contents and comments. The friends of the user will only be able to see the likes and comments from other users only if they are in a mutual friend group. For example, friends from high school are not able to see the comments and likes from friends from a university. When users post their moments, they can separate their friends into a few groups, and they can decide whether this Moment can be seen by particular groups of people. Contents posted can be set to "Private", and then only the user can view it. Unlike Sina Weibo or Instagram, these are only shared to the users friends. These are unlikey to go viral.

Weixin Pay digital payment services

Users who have provided bank account information may use the app to pay bills, order goods and services, transfer money to other users, and pay in stores if the stores have a Weixin payment option. Vetted third parties, known as "official accounts", offer these services by developing lightweight "apps within the app". Users can link their Chinese bank accounts, as well as Visa, MasterCard and JCB.

WeChat Pay, officially referred to as Weixin Pay, is a digital wallet service incorporated into Weixin, which allows users to perform mobile payments and send money between contacts.

Although users receive immediate notification of the transaction, the Weixin Pay system is not an instant payment instrument, because the funds transfer between counterparts is not immediate. The settlement time depends on the payment method chosen by the customer.

All Weixin users have their own Weixin Pay accounts. Users can acquire a balance by linking their Weixin account to their debit cards, or by receiving money from other users. For non-Chinese users of Weixin Pay, an additional identity verification process of providing a photo of a valid ID is required before certain functions of Weixin Pay become available. Users who link their credit card can only make payments to vendors, and cannot use this to top up WeChat balances. Weixin Pay can be used for digital payments, as well as payments from participating vendors. As of March 2016, Weixin Pay had over 300 million users.

Weixin Pay's main competitor in China and the market leader in online payments is Alibaba Group's Alipay. Alibaba company founder Jack Ma considered Weixin's red envelope feature to be a "Pearl Harbor moment", as it began to erode Alipay's historic dominance in the online payments industry in China, especially in peer-to-peer money transfer. The success prompted Alibaba to launch its own version of virtual red envelopes in its competing Laiwang service. Other competitors, Baidu Wallet and Sina Weibo, also launched similar features.

In 2019 it was reported that Weixin had overtaken Alibaba with 800 million active Weixin mobile payment users versus 520 million for Alibaba's Alipay. However Alibaba had a 54 per cent share of the Chinese mobile online payments market in 2017 compared to Weixin's 37 per cent share. In the same year, Tencent introduced "WeChat Pay HK", a payment service for users in Hong Kong. Transactions are carried out with the Hong Kong dollar. In 2019 it was reported that Chinese users can use WeChat Pay in 25 countries outside China, including, Italy, South Africa and the UK.

Enterprise WeChat
For work purposes, companies and business communication, a special version of WeChat called Enterprise WeChat (or Qiye Weixin) was launched in 2016. The app was meant to help employees separate work from private life. In addition to the usual chat features, the program let companies and their employees keep track of annual leave days and expenses that need to be reimbursed, employees could ask for time off or clock in to show they were at work.

WeChat Mini Program
In 2017, WeChat launched a feature called "Mini Programs". A mini program is an app within an app. Business owners can create mini apps in the WeChat system, implemented using JavaScript plus a proprietary API. Users may install these inside the WeChat app. In January 2018, WeChat announced a record of 580,000 mini programs. With one Mini Program, consumers could scan the Quick Response code using their mobile phone at a supermarket counter and pay the bill through the user's WeChat mobile wallet. WeChat Games have received huge popularity, with its "Jump Jump" game attracting 400 million players in less than 3 days and attaining 100 million daily active users in just two weeks after its launch, as of January 2018. Ever since WeChat Mini Program's Launch, daily active user (DAU) of WeChat Mini Programs are increasing dramatically. In 2017, there was only 160 million DAU, however, the number reached 450 million at 2021.

WeChat Channels 
In 2020, WeChat Channels was launched, which is a short video platform within WeChat that allows users to create and share short video clips and photos to their own WeChat Channel. Users of Channels can also discover content posted to other Channels by others via the in-built feed. Each post can include hashtags, a location tag, a short description, and a link to an WeChat official account article. In September 2021, it was reported that WeChat Channels began allowing users to upload hour-long videos, twice of the duration limit previously imposed on all WeChat Channels videos. Comparisons are often drawn between WeChat Channels and TikTok (or Douyin) for their similarity in features.

In January 2022, there were reports that WeChat is set to diversify further and place more emphasis on new products and services like WeChat Channels, amid new regulatory restrictions imposed in China.

By June 2021, WeChat Channels had accumulated over 200 million users. More than 27 million people had used the platform to watch Irish boy band Westlife's online concert in 2021, and 15 million users also viewed the Shenzhou 12 spaceflight launch using the app service.

Easy Mode 
In September 2021, WeChat introduced a brand-new feature on its platform called Easy Mode. It was mainly designed for elderly people with higher readability by providing a larger font size, sharper colours, and bigger buttons. Another feature provided in this update was the ability to listen to text messages. Easy Mode was released in version 8.0.14 for both iOS and Android.

Others

In 2015, WeChat offered a heat map feature that showed crowd density. Quartz columnist Josh Horwitz alleged the feature is being used by the Chinese government to track irregular assemblies of people to determine unlawful assembly.

In January 2016, Tencent launched WeChat Out, a VOIP service allowing users to call mobile phones and landlines around the world. The feature allowed purchasing credit within the app using a credit card. WeChat Out was originally only available in the United States, India, and Hong Kong, but later coverage was expanded to Thailand, Macau, Laos, and Italy.

In March 2017, Tencent released WeChat Index. By inserting a search term in the WeChat Index page, users could check the popularity of this term in the past 7, 30, or 90 days. The data was mined from data in official WeChat accounts and metrics such as social sharing, likes and reads were used in the evaluation.

In May 2017, Tencent started news feed and search functions for its WeChat app. The Financial Times reported this was a "direct challenge to Chinese search engine Baidu".

WeChat allowed people to add friends by a variety of methods, including searching by username or phone number, adding from phone or email contacts, playing a "message in a bottle" game, or viewing nearby people who are also using the same service. In 2015 WeChat added a "friend radar" function.

In 2017, WeChat was reported to be developing an augmented reality (AR) platform as part of its service offering. Its artificial intelligence team was working on a 3D rendering engine to create a realistic appearance of detailed objects in smartphone-based AR apps. They were also developing a simultaneous localization and mapping technology, which would help calculate the position of virtual objects relative to their environment, enabling AR interactions without the need for markers, such as Quick Response codes or special images.

In late 2019, WeChat released dark theme for Android users. It was released later in early 2020 for iOS amidst rumors that WeChat would be removed from the Apple store if they do not release dark theme.

In spring 2020, WeChat users are now able to change their WeChat ID more than once, being allowed to change their username only once per year. Prior to this, a WeChat ID could not be changed more than once.

On 17 June 2020, WeChat released a new add-on called "WeChat Nudge". The feature was first introduced in MSN Messenger 7.0, in 2005. The feature was called Buzz in Yahoo! Messenger and the feature had interoperability with MSN Messenger's Nudge. Similar to Messenger and Yahoo, users can access WeChat Nudge by double-clicking on other users' profiles in the chat. This virtually shakes user's profile photo and sends a vibration notification. Both users must have the latest Wechat update(7.0.13). If a user does not have the latest update they can't nudge another user but can still receive nudges. A user can only nudge another user if they have previous conversations. Newly added friends without previous messages cannot nudge each other.

On January 21, 2021, WeChat released its iOS Version 8.0. WeChat has added the function of animated emoji, such as the emojis of Bomb, Fireworks, and Celebration. When sending or receiving them from the chat box, an explosion animation will pop up .

On March 30, 2022, According to the relevant laws and regulations of China, in order to prevent the risk of publicity stunt in virtual currency transactions, the Wechat public platform has recently standardized the official account and mini program of secondary sales of digital collections。

On August 24, 2022, WeChat iOS platform has received the official update 8.0.27. Now WeChat users can send a maximum of 99 pictures, whereas in the past, users could only send a maximum of 9 pictures to your friends in WeChat at once.

WeChat Business
WeChat Business is one of the latest mobile social network business model after e-commerce, which utilizes business relationships and friendships to maintain a customer relationship. Comparing with the traditional E-business like JD.com and Alibaba, WeChat Business has a large range of influence and profits with less input and lower threshold, which attracts lots of people to join in WeChat business.

Marketing modes

B2C Mode
This is the main profit mode of WeChat Business. The first one is to launch advertisements and provide services through the WeChat Official Account, which is a B2C mode. This mode has been used by many hospitals, banks, fashion brands, internet companies and personal blogs because the Official Account can access online payment, location sharing, voice messages, and mini-games. It is like a 'mini app', so the company has to hire specific staff to manage the account. By 2015, there were more than 100 million WeChat Official Accounts on this platform.

B2B Mode
WeChat salesperson in this mode is for promoting products by individuals, which belongs to C2C mode. In this mode, individual sellers post relevant photos and messages of their agent products on the WeChat Moments or WeChat groups and sell products to their WeChat friends. Besides, they develop friendships with their customers by sending messages in festivals or write comments under their updates on WeChat moments to increase their trust. Also, continuing to communicate with the regular customers raises the 'WOF' (word-of-mouth) communications, which influences decision-making. Some WeChat businessmen already have an online shop in Taobao, but use WeChat to maintain existing customers.

Existing problems
As more and more people have joined WeChat Business, it has brought many problems. For example, some sellers have begun to sell counterfeit luxury goods such as bags, clothes and watches. Some sellers have disguised themselves as international flight attendants or overseas students to post fake stylish photos on WeChat Moments. They then claim that they can provide overseas purchasing services but sell counterfeit luxury goods at the same price as the authentic ones. Other popular products selling on WeChat are facial masks. The marketing mode is like that of Amway but most goods are unbranded products which come from illegal factories making excess hormones which could have serious effects on customers' health. However, it is difficult for customers to defend their rights because a large number of sellers' identities are uncertified. Additionally, the lack of any supervision mechanism in WeChat business also provides opportunities for criminals to continue this illegal behavior. In early 2022, WeChat suspended more than a dozen NFT (non-fungible token) public accounts to clean up crypto speculation and scalping. The crackdown on NFT-related content comes from domestic digital collectibles, which cannot be resold for profit.

Marketing

Campaigns
In a 2016 campaign, users could upload a paid photo on "Moments" and other users could pay to see the photo and comment on it. The photos were taken down each night.

Collaborations
In 2014, Burberry partnered with WeChat to create its own WeChat apps around its fall 2014 runway show, giving users live streams from the shows. Another brand, Michael Kors used WeChat to give live updates from their runway show, and later to run a photo contest "Chic Together WeChat campaign".

In 2016, L'Oréal China cooperated with Papi Jiang to promote their products. Over one million people watched her first video promoting L'Oreal's beauty brand MG.

In 2016, WeChat partnered with 60 Italian companies (WeChat had an office in Milan) who were able to sell their products and services on the Chinese market without having to get a license to operate a business in China. In 2017, Andrea Ghizzoni, European director of Tencent, said that 95 percent of global luxury brands used WeChat.

In 2020 Burberry and WeChat collaborated to design a shop in Shenzhen where Burberry has a flagship store, as well as an app allowing shoppers to interact with the shop digitally.

Platforms
WeChat's mobile phone app is available only to Android and iOS. BlackBerry, Windows Phone, and Symbian phones were supported before. However, as of 22 September 2017, WeChat was no longer working on Windows Phones. The company ceased the development of the app for Windows Phones before the end of 2017. Although Web-based OS X and Windows clients exist, this requires the user to have the app installed on a supported mobile phone for authentication, and neither message roaming nor 'Moments' are provided. Thus, without the app on a supported phone, it is not possible to use the web-based WeChat clients on the computer.

The company also provides WeChat for Web, a web-based client with messaging and file transfer capabilities. Other functions cannot be used on it, such as the detection of nearby people, or interacting with Moments or Official Accounts. To use the Web-based client, it is necessary to first scan a QR code using the phone app. This means it is not possible to access the WeChat network if a user does not possess a suitable smartphone with the app installed.

WeChat could be accessed on Windows using BlueStacks until December 2014. After that, WeChat blocked Android emulators and accounts that have signed in from emulators may be frozen.

There have been some reported issues with the Web client. Specifically when using English, some users have experienced autocorrect, autocomplete, auto-capitalization, and auto-delete behavior as they type messages and even after the message was sent. For example, "gonna" was autocorrected to "go", the E's were auto-deleted in "need", "wechat" was auto-capitalized to "Wechat" but not "WeChat", and after the message was sent, "don't" got auto-corrected to "do not". However, the auto-corrected word(s) after the message was sent appeared on the phone app as the user had originally typed it ("don't" was seen on the phone app whereas "do not" was seen on the Web client). Users could translate a foreign language during a conversation and the words were posted on Moments.

WeChat opens up video calls for multiple people not only for a one-person call.

Controversies

State surveillance and intelligence gathering

WeChat operates from China under Chinese law, which includes strong censorship provisions and interception protocols. Its parent company is obliged to share data with the Chinese government under the China Internet Security Law and National Intelligence Law. WeChat can access and expose the text messages, contact books, and location histories of its users. Due to WeChat's popularity, the Chinese government uses WeChat as a data source to conduct mass surveillance in China.

Some states and regions such as India, Australia the United States, and Taiwan fear that the app poses a threat to national or regional security for various reasons. In June 2013, the Indian Intelligence Bureau flagged WeChat for security concerns. India has debated whether or not they should ban WeChat for the possibility that too much personal information and data could be collected from its users. In Taiwan, legislators were concerned that the potential exposure of private communications was a threat to regional security.

In 2016, Tencent was awarded a score of zero out of 100 in an Amnesty International report ranking technology companies on the way they implement encryption to protect the human rights of their users. The report placed Tencent last out of a total of 11 companies, including Facebook, Apple, and Google, for the lack of privacy protections built into WeChat and QQ. The report found that Tencent did not make use of end-to-end encryption, which is a system that allows only the communicating users to read the messages. It also found that Tencent did not recognize online threats to human rights, did not disclose government requests for data, and did not publish specific data about its use of encryption.

A September 2017 update to the platform's privacy policy detailed that log data collected by WeChat included search terms, profiles visited, and content that had been viewed within the app. Additionally, metadata related to the communications between WeChat users—including call times, duration, and location information—was also collected. This information, which was used by Tencent for targeted advertising and marketing purposes, might be disclosed to representatives of the Chinese government:
 To comply with an applicable law or regulations.
 To comply with a court order, subpoena, or other legal process.
 In response to a request by a government authority, law enforcement agency, or similar body.

In May 2020, Citizen Lab published a study which claimed that WeChat monitors foreign chats to hone its censorship algorithms.

On August 14, 2020, Radio Free Asia reported that in 2019, Gao Zhigang, a citizen of Taiyuan city, Shanxi Province, China, used WeChat to forward a video to his friend Geng Guanjun in USA. Gao was later convicted on the charge of the crime “picking quarrels and provoking troubles”, and sentenced to ten-months imprisonment. The Court documents show that China's network management and propaganda departments directly monitor WeChat users, and the Chinese police used big data facial technology to identify Geng Guanjun as an overseas democracy activist.

In September 2020, Chevron Corporation mandated that its employees delete WeChat from company-issued phones.

Privacy issues
Users inside and outside of China also have expressed concern for the privacy issues of the app. Human rights activist Hu Jia was jailed for three years for sedition. He speculated that the officials of the Internal Security Bureau of the Ministry of Public Security listened to his voicemail messages that were directed to his friends, repeating the words displayed within the voice mail messages to Hu Jia. Chinese authorities have further accused the WeChat app of threatening individual safety. China Central Television (CCTV), a state-run broadcaster, featured a piece in which WeChat was described as an app that helped criminals due to its location-reporting features. CCTV gave an example of such accusations through reporting the murder of a single woman who, after he attempted to rob her, was murdered by a man she met on WeChat. The location-reporting feature, according to reports, was the reason for the man knowing the victim's whereabouts. Authorities within China have linked WeChat to numerous crimes. The city of Hangzhou, for example, reported over twenty crimes related to WeChat in the span of three months.

XcodeGhost malware

In 2015, Apple published a list of the top 25 most popular apps infected with the XcodeGhost malware, confirming earlier reports that version 6.2.5 of WeChat for iOS was infected with it. The malware originated in a counterfeit version of Xcode (dubbed "XcodeGhost"), Apple's software development tools, and made its way into the compiled app through a modified framework. Despite Apple's review process, WeChat and other infected apps were approved and distributed through the App Store. Even though some sources claimed that the malware was capable of prompting the user for their account credentials, opening URLs and reading the device's clipboard, Apple responded that the malware was not capable of doing "anything malicious" or transmitting any personally identifiable information beyond "apps and general system information" and that it had no information that suggested that this had happened. Some commentators considered this to be the largest security breach in the App Store's history.

Current ban in India
In June 2020, the Government of India banned WeChat along with 58 other Chinese apps citing data and privacy issues, in response to a border clash between India and China earlier in the year. The banned Chinese apps were "stealing and surreptitiously transmitting users’ data in an unauthorized manner to servers which have locations outside India," and was "hostile to national security and defense of India", claimed India's Ministry of Electronics and Information Technology.

Previous ban in Russia
On 6 May 2017, Russia blocked access to WeChat for failing to give its contact details to the Russian communications watchdog. The ban was swiftly lifted on 11 May 2017 after Tencent provided "relevant information" for registration to the Federal Service for Supervision of Communications, Information Technology and Mass Media (Roskomnadzor).

Ban and injunction against ban in the United States
On August 6, 2020, U.S. President Donald Trump signed an executive order, invoking the International Emergency Economic Powers Act, seeking to ban WeChat in the U.S. in 45 days, due to its connections with the Chinese-owned Tencent. This was signed alongside a similar executive order targeting TikTok and its Chinese-owned ByteDance.

The Department of Commerce issued orders on September 18, 2020, to enact the ban on WeChat and TikTok by the end of September 20, 2020, citing national security and data privacy concerns. The measures ban the transferring of funds or processing through WeChat in the U.S. and bar any company from offering hosting, content delivery networks or internet transit to WeChat.

Magistrate Judge Laurel Beeler of the United States District Court for the Northern District of California issued a preliminary injunction blocking the Department of Commerce order on both TikTok and WeChat on September 20, 2020, based on respective lawsuits filed by TikTok and US WeChat Users Alliance, citing the merits of the plaintiffs' First Amendment claims. The Justice Department had previously asked Beeler to not block the order to ban the apps saying it would undermine the presidents ability to deal with threats to national security. In her ruling, Beeler said that while the government had established that Chinese government activities raised significant national security concerns, it showed little evidence that the WeChat ban would address those concerns.

On June 9, 2021, U.S. President Joe Biden signed an executive order revoking the ban on WeChat and TikTok. Instead, he directed the commerce secretary to investigate foreign influence enacted through the apps.

Notorious Markets list 
In 2022, the Office of the United States Trade Representative added WeChat's ecommerce ecosystem to its list of Notorious Markets for Counterfeiting and Piracy.

Censorship

Global censorship

Starting in 2013, reports arose that Chinese-language searches even outside China were being keyword filtered and then blocked. This occurred on incoming traffic to China from foreign countries but also exclusively between foreign parties (the service had already censored its communications within China). In the international example of blocking, a message was displayed on users' screens: "The message "" your message contains restricted words. Please check it again." These are the Chinese characters for a Guangzhou-based paper called Southern Weekly (or, alternatively, Southern Weekend). The next day Tencent released a statement addressing the issue saying "A small number of WeChat international users were not able to send certain messages due to a technical glitch this Thursday. Immediate actions have been taken to rectify it. We apologize for any inconvenience it has caused to our users. We will continue to improve the product features and technological support to provide a better user experience." WeChat planned to build two different platforms to avoid this problem in the future; one for the Chinese mainland and one for the rest of the world. The problem existed because WeChat's servers were all located in China and thus subjected to its censorship rules.

Following the overwhelming victory of pro-democracy candidates in the 2019 Hong Kong local elections WeChat censored messages related to the election and disabled the accounts of posters in other countries such as U.S. and Canada. Many of those targeted were of Chinese ancestry.

In 2020, WeChat started censoring messages concerning the COVID-19 pandemic.

In December 2020 WeChat blocked a post by Australian Prime Minister Scott Morrison during a diplomatic spat between Australia and China. In his WeChat post Morrison had criticized a doctored image posted by a Chinese diplomat and praised the Chinese-Australian community. According to Reuters the company claimed to have blocked the post for "violated regulations, including distorting historical events and confusing the public."

Two censorship systems

In 2016, the Citizen Lab published a report saying that WeChat was using different censorship policies in mainland China and other areas. They found that:

 Keyword filtering was only enabled for users who registered via phone numbers from mainland China;
 Users did not get notices anymore when messages are blocked; 
 Filtering was more strict on group chat;
 Keywords were not static. Some newfound censored keywords were in response to current news events;
 The Internal browser in WeChat blocked Chinese accounts from accessing some websites such as gambling, Falun Gong and critical reports on China. International users were not blocked except for accessing some gambling and pornography websites.

Restricting sharing websites in "Moments"
In 2014, WeChat announced that according to "related regulations", domains of the web pages that want to get shared in WeChat Moments need to get an Internet Content Provider (ICP) license by 31 December 2014 to avoid being restricted by WeChat.

Censorship in Iran

In September 2013, WeChat was blocked in Iran. The Iranian authorities cited WeChat Nearby (Friend Radar) and the spread of pornographic content as the reason of censorship.

The Committee for Determining Instances of Criminal Content (a working group under the supervision of the attorney general) website FAQ says:

Because WeChat collects phone data and monitors member activity and because app developers are outside of the country and not cooperating, this software has been blocked, so you can use domestic applications for cheap voice calls, video calls and messaging.

On 4 January 2018, WeChat was unblocked in Iran.

Crackdown on LGBTQ accounts in China
On July 6, 2021, several WeChat accounts associated with China's university campuses LGBTQ movement were blocked and then deleted without warning, the official media said they had no knowledge of this. Some of the accounts, which consisted of a mix of registered student clubs and unofficial grassroots groups had operated for years as safe spaces for China's LGBTQ youth, with tens of thousands of followers. Many of the closed WeChat accounts display messages saying that they had "violated" Internet regulations, without giving further details, with account names being deleted and replaced with "unnamed", with a notice claiming that all content was blocked and accounts were suspended after receiving relevant complaints. The U.S. State Department expressed concern that the accounts were deleted when they were merely expressing their views, exercising their right to freedom of expression and freedom of speech. Several groups that had their accounts deleted spoke out against the ban with one stating "[W]e hope to use this opportunity to start again with a continued focus on gender and society, and to embrace courage and love".

Notes

References

External links
 
 Install WeChat for PC Windows

 
Software companies established in 2011
2011 software
Android (operating system) software
BlackBerry software
Chinese brands
Communication software
Instant messaging clients
IOS software
Mobile applications
Mobile telecommunication services
Organizations that oppose LGBT rights
Proprietary cross-platform software
Symbian software
Super-apps
Tencent software
Universal Windows Platform apps
WatchOS software
Delisted applications
Internet properties established in 2011
Tencent
Notorious markets
Internet censorship in India